The Fascist Defence Force (FDF) was the paramilitary section of the British Union of Fascists (BUF).

It was established in August 1933 by Oswald Mosley, after the BUF acquired its headquarters, the Black House (formerly The Whitelands Teacher Training College) in King's Road, Chelsea. The Fascist Defence Force comprised three hundred men; they wore black shirts and black trousers (their shirts, modelled on Mosley's fencing jacket, were akin to polo neck sweaters) as well as six badges and stripes to denote rank. They also wore a red armband with the BUF symbol of a flash of lightning in a circle, representing "action within unity".

An elite unit within the Fascist Defence Force, the I Squad, served as Mosley's personal bodyguards; they also wore black fencing jackets, but with black leather breeches and boots.

The Force maintained thirty motor vehicles, including five rapid transportation vans specially equipped with wire mesh windows and plating at the sides for protection against missiles, each with a seating capacity of 20.

The FDF was commanded by Eric Piercy, a Special Constabulary Inspector and ex-insurance agent; his second-in-command was Ian Dundas, a former Royal Navy officer.

References

Fascism in the United Kingdom
Racism in the United Kingdom
Oswald Mosley
Military wings of fascist parties
Fascist organizations